Justice Arthur Eric Keuneman I, KC (1885-) was a Ceylonese (Sri Lankan) judge and lawyer. He was a Puisne Justice of the Supreme Court of Ceylon.

He was educated at the Royal College Colombo and at the University of Cambridge. He was called to bar at the Gray's Inn.

Keuneman married Majorie Eleanor Shockman, daughter of a Surgeon from Kandy. They had two children, Pieter Keuneman who became a Cabinet Minister and Arthur Eric Keuneman II (Jnr) a Crown Counsel in the Attorney-General's Department.

References

External links
 Keuneman Ancestry

1861 births
1947 deaths
Acting Chief Justices of British Ceylon
Alumni of Royal College, Colombo
Alumni of the University of Cambridge
Burgher judges
Burgher lawyers
Ceylonese Queen's Counsel
Sri Lankan barristers
Members of Gray's Inn
British Ceylon judges
Puisne Justices of the Supreme Court of Ceylon
20th-century King's Counsel
Sri Lankan people of Dutch descent